Micropleuridae is a family of nematodes belonging to the order Rhabditida.

Genera:
 Granulinema Moravec & Little, 1988
 Kamegainema Hasegawa, Doi, Araki & Miyata, 2000
 Micropleura Linstow, 1906
 Philonema
 Protenema Petter & Planelles, 1986

References

Nematodes